David Simango is a Mozambican politician who has been Mayor of Maputo since 2008. He is a member of FRELIMO. He was Governor of Niassa Province from 2000 to 2005 and then Minister of Youth and Sports from 2005 to 2008. He was elected as Mayor of Maputo in 2008 and he was re-elected in 2013.

References

Living people
Recipients of the Eduardo Mondlane Order
Year of birth missing (living people)
Place of birth missing (living people)